Mirna Peč  is a rural settlement in southeast Slovenia. It is the seat of the Municipality of Mirna Peč.

Geography
Mirna Peč is located about 10 km northwest of Novo Mesto, the cultural and administrative centre of the traditional region of Lower Carniola, in the heart of the Temenica Valley. Mirna Peč consists of 16 streets: Brezence, Borovje, Češence, Industrijska cesta, Ivanja Vas, Marof, Na hirb, Ob avtocesti, Postja, Prisojna Pot, Rogovila, Rožna Ulica, Šranga, Trg, and Vihre.

Culture
The Mirna Peč parish church of Saint Cantianius is part of the Roman Catholic Diocese of Novo Mesto. It was built in 1915 on the site of a 15th-century predecessor.

Notable people
Notable people that were born or lived in Mirna Peč include:
Anton Bartel (1853–1938), lexicographer
Franc Dular  (1860–1924), veterinarian
Karel Javoršek (1873–1916), composer
Ivan Kovačič (a.k.a. Efenka) (1921–1963), Partisan and People's Hero of Yugoslavia
Stane Potočar (a.k.a. Lakar) (1919–1997), Partisan and People's Hero of Yugoslavia
Mara Rupena (a.k.a. Osolnik) (1918–2003), Partisan and editor
Zora Rupena (a.k.a. Katja) (1920–1945), Partisan
Ludvik Starič  (1906–1989), motorcyclist
Albert Struna (1901–1982), engineer

References

External links
 
 Mirna Peč on Geopedia

Populated places in the Municipality of Mirna Peč